Porcupine Peak is a mountain east of Dillon in Summit County, Colorado. Located east of Porcupine Peak is Lenawee Mountain and Independence Mountain and Bear Mountain is located south.

References

Mountains of Colorado
Mountains of Summit County, Colorado
North American 3000 m summits